The Tartan or The Tartan: Radford University News is a student-run newspaper published weekly for readers in and around Radford University in Radford, Virginia. Its mission is to provide the students and faculty of Radford University, as well as the residents of the surrounding city of Radford, with news pertaining to the University and surrounding community. The paper is circulated every Wednesday afternoon, and is the most widely circulated publication in the town of Radford. The paper was first published in January 1921.

History 
The Tartan was originally named The Grapurchat. Its first issue was four pages, featured one picture, and detailed a cocktail party which had happened the week before. Since then, The Tartan's staff has grown to include an editor-in-chief, a managing editor, four section editors, four assistant editors and a graphics and photography team to take pictures in the field and create their own designs. The Tartan has a weekly circulation of 4,000.

The Tartan utilizes the RU Student Media's in-house advertising agency, SMADS, to gather and design advertisements which it uses as its main stream of revenue. The paper nets about $2,100 a week in ad revenue alone.

In March 2011, The Tartan launched a WordPress website to complement the print form of the publication. The website features a mix of articles published in the weekly issues of the paper, but also plays host to content uploaded throughout the week that does not get published in the weekly Wednesday editions.

External links 
The Tartan

Newspapers established in 1921
Radford University
Radford, Virginia
Student newspapers published in Virginia
Weekly newspapers published in the United States
1921 establishments in Virginia